Thomas Bleiner (born 30 December 1969) is an Austrian racing driver, inventor and businessman. He is the inventor of the laser anticrash system “All Weather Light”, a safety device for poor visibility conditions. In 2004 he was invited to the Global Road Safety, United Nations in New York, in order to promote safety in the automotive field. Lately he is caring about renewable energy, especially about photovoltaic applications.

Sports career
1992: German Formula 3 KMS TEAM
2000: Formula 3000 Italian Championship
2001: Porsche Pirelli Supercup KADACH TEAM
2001: Spider Renault
2002: Porsche Supercup KADACH TEAM and FIA GT
2003: Porsche Supercup DEWALT TEAM
2004: FIA GT with Ferrari 575 Maranello JMB TEAM

Business career
1990: Commercial Director for Gamko BV
1992: “All Weather Light” laser Patent
1993-1996: Development of the laser Patent in USA
1997: Marine Engine Manager at Lamborghini Automobili SPA
2002: Founder of Astron Group Technologies SA
2004: Member of the Global Road Safety (UN)
2005: Joint Venture between Astron Group Technologie SA and FIAMM SPA
2006: Incorporation of Astron FIAMM Safety SPA
2007: CEO of Genius Sight LTD
2008: President of Bleiner AG

References
1995 Letter to NHTSA
1996 article on Corriere della Sera
2004 United Nations speech

External links
 Official Thomas Bleiner Site: www.thomasbleiner.com

1969 births
Living people
Austrian racing drivers
Porsche Supercup drivers